The governor of Lanao del Sur, is the chief executive of the provincial government of Lanao del Sur.

Provincial Governors (1987-2025)

References

Governors of Lanao del Sur
Lanao del Sur